The ranks of the German Armed Forces, (in German: Bundeswehr), were set up by the President with the Anordnung des Bundespräsidenten über die Dienstgradbezeichnungen und die Uniform der Soldaten on the basis of section 4, paragraph 3 of the Soldatengesetz (federal law concerning the legal status of soldiers). The Bundesbesoldungsordnung (Federal Salary Scale Regulation) regulates the salary scales of all Federal office holders and employees including soldiers. The 'ZdV-64/10 – Abkürzungen in der Bundeswehr' gives the abbreviations and a list of the abbreviations.

Rank structure 
In all three branches of the German armed forces there are three career paths: officers (Offiziere), NCOs (Unteroffiziere, non-commissioned officers) and enlisted soldiers (Mannschaften). Officers are subdivided into Lieutenants (Leutnante), Captains (Hauptleute), Staff Officers (Stabsoffiziere) and Admirals (Admiräle) or Generals (Generäle). NCOs are divided into those with or without a sword knot lanyard (mit / ohne Portepee).

The names of ranks in the army and air force are identical; those of the navy and of medical officers are different. Female soldiers hold the same rank as their male counterparts. A (w) abbreviation is still sometimes added for women, but this is wholly without legal basis – the only additions allowed and maintained in ZDv 14/5 bzw. in the ZDv 20/7 are:
 UA / RUA – NCO Candidate (Unteroffizieranwärter) / Reserve NCO Candidate (Reserveunteroffizier-Anwärter)
 FA / RFA – Sergeant Candidate (Feldwebelanwärter) / Reserve Sergeant Candidate (Reservefeldwebel-Anwärter)
 OA / ROA – Officer Candidate (Offizieranwärter) / Reserve Officer Candidate (Reserveoffizier-Anwärter)
 SanOA – Medical Officer Candidate (Sanitätsoffizieranwärter)
 MilMusikOA – Military Musical Officer Candidate (Militärmusikoffizier-Anwärter)

Retired personnel 
After retirement from active duty, former career soldiers are entitled to use their former rank with the addition of the abbreviation  a.D. (außer Dienst = ret.) in correspondence.

Retired soldiers may obtain a permission to wear dress uniform on formal social occasions. The uniform also shows the branch and the emblem of the last unit the soldier has served in.

Reservists 
Reservists serving as enlisted men, NCOs or Officers add d.R. (der Reserve = of the reserve) after their rank, but only when not on active duty (during an exercise or DVag they are just soldiers, like any other active soldier – there is nothing to mark that they are "only" Reservists) and in correspondence, not in speaking their rank. Like in the active duty, epaulettes demonstrate rank, supplemented by a colored cord which shows the branch the soldier is serving. Special additional cord colors are:
Silver: Offizieranwärter (Officer Candidate)
Gold: Feldwebelanwärter (Sergeant Candidate)
Officer, Sergeant or NCO candidates in the reserve add ROA, RFA or RUA, while active officer, Sergeant or NCO candidates add OA, FA or UA.
Reservists have the same promotion periods and service times as active soldiers. Reservists can go through a part of military exercises when they are summoned to join a unit.

Promotion 

The promotion ceremony is performed during a regular unit meeting, at a special event or in private. A suitable commander will announce the promotion by reading the order to that effect, while the soldiers to be promoted will stand forward at attention facing the unit. If regular battledress is worn, it is customary that two fellow soldiers from the same rank group, but slightly senior, replace the shoulder strap sleeves from both sides with a pair indicating the new rank. They will then stand in front of the soldier and apply a simultaneous slap with one outstretched arm each on the respective shoulder, so as if to indicate the added weight and responsibility of the new rank.

Table of ranks

Army and air force 
Rank insignia are worn on both shoulders.
See also
⇒ Article: Rank insignia of the German Bundeswehr

Enlisted personnel 
Enlisted personnel (Mannschaften) were largely made up of conscripts serving their term which could be voluntarily extended to a maximum total of 23 months. Since July 2011, compulsory military service has now been suspended during peacetime. Since this was replaced by a purely voluntary service, still a large part of the enlisted personnel are serving less than two years (voluntary military service – two years or more contracts are called Soldier for a Period of Time). Starting as Schütze (Rifleman) or trooper a promotion to Gefreiter rank is expected after primary recruit training (usually after three or six months depending on the service unit). After an additional three months of service (usually consisting of special training required for their branch of service) a soldier is usually promoted to Obergefreiter rank unless they fail even most basic requirements. Enlisted soldiers will usually receive their Hauptgefreiter promotion after nine months to award outstanding performance or after twelve months of service. With higher qualification it is also possible to be promoted to Hauptgefreiter by the first day. 

To be promoted Stabsgefreiter a soldier requires at least three years of enlisted service.  Soldiers may opt to sign long-term contracts as enlisted soldiers, but most enlisted soldiers serving long terms in fact applied for NCO (non-commissioned officer) careers but failed their training requirements and opted to serve their term as enlisted soldiers rather than being released from service immediately.

To be promoted to Oberstabsgefreiter a soldier requires at least four years of enlisted service.

The most important distinction between NCOs and enlisted men is that the latter cannot give any order even to lower-ranking soldiers unless specific circumstances apply (e.g. while on guard duty or to soldiers ordered to do so by their regular chain of command).

The rank Soldat is replaced by ranks specific to their Truppengattung (branch of service):
 Flieger (Flg) Airman
 Funker (Fu) Signaller
 Grenadier (Gren) Grenadier
 Jäger (Jg) Ranger (lit. Hunter)
 Kanonier (Kan) Gunner/Bombardier
 Matrose (M) Seaman/Sailor
 Pionier (Pi) Engineer
 Panzerfunker (PzFu) Mech. Radioman
 Panzergrenadier (PzGren) Mech. Grenadeer
 Panzerjäger (PzJg) Tank Destroyer/Hunter
 Panzerkanonier (PzKan) Armour Gunner
 Panzerpionier (PzPi) Armour Pioneer
 Panzerschütze (PzSchtz) Tanker/Armour Rifleman
 Panzersoldat (PzSdt) Tanker
 Sanitätssoldat (SanSdt) Medic
 Schütze (Schtz) Rifleman (catch-all rank for supply and other branches)

Non-commissioned officers 

NCOs (Unteroffiziere) play an important role in the Heer as they are entrusted the command of most sub-company units. They often are referred to as the backbone of the army. Especially Feldwebels and above carry similar responsibilities officers have. This is largely due to the German military doctrine of Auftragstaktik: German orders usually do not include specific instructions, but rather a task, the available time and the available means. This gives leaders of smaller units a great deal of freedom and responsibility.

Since the ancient time of Prussian Army, the non-commissioned officers or subofficers of German armies are distinguished into
a) Unteroffiziere ohne Portepee (sub-officers without lanyard)
b) Unteroffiziere mit Portepee (sub-officers with lanyard)

These terms originate from the tradition that Prussian NCOs from the rank of Feldwebel upwards were entitled to bear a lanyard on their sabre.

Soldiers have the possibility to start with the rank of an Unteroffizier or even Stabsunteroffizier if they already have a civil apprenticeship which qualifies them for any army-equivalent position. Civil master craftsman of army-relevant jobs may directly start as Feldwebel. The army decides depending on the availability of positions.

The promotion to Oberfeldwebel is regularly given after one year as Feldwebel. Any higher rank requires a certain number of years in their previous rank and performance. Soldiers with at least eight years active duty (six for flying crews and those in some other positions), of which five are as a feldwebel, are eligible for promotion to hauptfeldwebel.  Those serving for at least 12 years have the chance to become a Stabsfeldwebel.  16 years after promotion to Feldwebel, and six years after promotion to hauptfeldwebel a soldier may be eligible for promotion to Oberstabsfeldwebel.

These rules apply for navy sub-officers in the same way.

Officer education in the army 

Career officers usually start out as enlisted personnel with the lowest rank in one of the three officer candidate battalions of the German Army located in Hammelburg, Idar-Oberstein and Munster. After six months of officer candidate training course in these battalions, containing basic military drill, military law and history, the officer candidates proceed with the Officer's Course 1.

These are held at the Officer's School in Dresden for three months, followed by a 10-week period for training English and three months of active service, the so-called Truppenkommando as regular soldier in a military unit.

After 15 months, the officer candidates attend one of the two Universities of the German Federal Armed Forces in Munich and Hamburg to attain a master's degree after four years of study.

After promotion to Leutnant (second lieutenant) they continue with the Officer's Course 2 at the Army Officer's School and the Officer's Course 3 at their respective branch-schools.

Furthermore, they attend required special training courses like a survival or driving school for the different vehicles of their branch.

When this six-year-training is concluded, the officers are promoted to Oberleutnant (first lieutenant) and transferred to their army-units for regular service.

Officer education in the air force 

In the air force the career starts at the air force academy in Fürstenfeldbruck (Fürsti) near Munich. The basic officers training consists of 11 months of basic training, military drill, theoretical education and a few weeks in a Luftwaffenausbildungsregiment (air force training regiment) as a deputy instructor with the rank of Obergefreiter OA. With the completion of the Offizierschule der Luftwaffe (OSLw) they are promoted to Fahnenjunker and either start with their studies at one of the two universities in Munich and Hamburg, or start with their basic flight training.

Field grade officers 

In order to be promoted to Major (major; a rank only career officers can achieve), the officers have to complete successfully a course called Basislehrgang Stabsoffizier (BLS) (field grade officer basic course). It takes a minimum of 10 years of officer's service to become a major. Oberstleutnant '(lt.-col.) is the standard final rank for career officers which can be awarded after 17 years of service. The salary of this rank depends on the respective function (A 14 or A 15 in the German salary scheme). Oberst (colonel) is the highest field grade rank (promotion requires a minimum of 17 years of officer's service, i.e. 20 years of service overall).

Officers in General Staff Service 
About 1.5 percent of each cohort are chosen to take part in the Generalstabslehrgang (general staff course) at the Führungsakademie der Bundeswehr (military academy) at Hamburg. This course lasts two years after the completion of which the participants put a "i.G." after their rank in case they serve on a corresponding post in a staff (at least in a brigade staff), meaning im Generalstabsdienst (in general staff service). Having completed this course, the minimum rank those officers achieve is usually Oberst (colonel). The Generalstabslehrgang is a necessary requirement for the promotion to a General's rank.

Notable cases

Officers of the medical service 
Officers of the medical service of the Bundeswehr are non-line officers in the special careers of the medical, dental, veterinary and pharmacy branches. Medical service officer have rank titles that are different from line-officers and with slight differences between branches, e.g. a medical officer holding a rank equivalent to Hauptmann is called Stabsarzt, a dental officer Stabszahnarzt, a veterinary officer Stabsveterinär and a pharmacy officer Stabsapotheker.

Generalmajor and Generalleutnant 
While a major by far outranks a lieutenant, a lieutenant general outranks a major general. This phenomenon, which the Bundeswehr shares with most armed forces (including English-speaking ones) and the former Wehrmacht (where the ranks were one degree lower, as there did not exist a brigadier general), requires explanation. The reason is that in the Early Modern Period, a company would be commanded by a captain, with assistance of a lieutenant and a Wachtmeister (sergeant, similar to Feldwebel). A regiment, on the other hand would be commanded by a colonel (Oberst, i. e. Obersthauptmann - literally "supreme captain"), with assistance of a lieutenant colonel and an Oberstwachtmeister (sergeant major). A whole army, then, quite logically was commanded by a general (Generalhauptmann - captain general), with assistance of a lieutenant general and a Generalwachtmeister (sergeant major general). When for the Oberstwachtmeister the name major became common, it was also adapted to the Generalwachtmeister, which then became major general while still inferior to lieutenant general. (Outside Germany, the former Wachtmeister on the company-size by the same transfer became known as the sergeant major.)

Historical ranks in the Prussian Army of Frederick the Great

References

External links 
 Rank-insignia learning at simsso.de
 Uniformen

 
Germany